Paul Moses Samson Naimanhye (b. 24 December 1960 ) is an Anglican bishop in Uganda: since 2016 he has been the Bishop of Busoga.

Naimanhye was educated at Uganda Christian University. His last post before becoming a bishop was as Dean of Christ's Cathedral, Bugembe.

References

21st-century Anglican bishops in Uganda
Uganda Christian University alumni
Anglican bishops of Busoga
Living people
1960 births